Alan Foster (born 10 March 1971) was a Scottish footballer.  He began his career with junior side Kilsyth Rangers before signing 'senior' with Dumbarton.

References

1971 births
Scottish footballers
Dumbarton F.C. players
Scottish Football League players
Living people
Scottish Junior Football Association players
Kilsyth Rangers F.C. players
Association football fullbacks
Footballers from Glasgow